At the 1932 Summer Olympics in Los Angeles, eleven swimming events were contested, six for men and five for women. The competitions were held from Saturday, August 6, to Saturday, August 13, 1932.  There was a total of 128 participants from 20 countries competing.

Medal table

Medal summary

Men's events

Women's events

Participating nations
128 swimmers from 20 nations competed.

References

External links
 

 
1932 Summer Olympics events
1932
1932 in swimming
International aquatics competitions hosted by the United States